Nirmal Nanan (19 August 1951 – 4 December 2021) was a West Indian first-class cricketer active from 1969 to 80 who played for Nottinghamshire and in Trinidad. Nanan was born in Preysal, Trinidad. Nanan's nephew Rangy Nanan played Test cricket for West Indies.

He died on 4 December 2021, at the age of 70.

References

External links
 

1951 births
2021 deaths
Nottinghamshire cricketers
People from Couva–Tabaquite–Talparo
Trinidad and Tobago cricketers